Susanlyg or Mokhrenes is a village in the Khojavend District of Azerbaijan, in the disputed region of Nagorno-Karabakh. The village had an ethnic Armenian-majority population prior to the 2020 Nagorno-Karabakh war, and also had an Armenian majority in 1989.

History 
During the Soviet period, the village was part of the Hadrut District of the Nagorno-Karabakh Autonomous Oblast. After the First Nagorno-Karabakh War, the village was administrated as part of the Hadrut Province of the breakaway Republic of Artsakh. The village came under the control of Azerbaijan during the 2020 Nagorno-Karabakh war.

Historical heritage sites 
Historical heritage sites in and around the village include the 5th/6th-century monastery church of Okhty Drni, a 10th/11th-century khachkar, a 13th-century bridge, an 18th/19th-century cemetery, and the church of Surb Sargis built in 1840. St. Sargis church was destroyed between March and July 2022.

Demographics 
The village had 212 inhabitants in 2005, and 180 inhabitants in 2015.

Gallery

References

External links 

 

Populated places in Khojavend District
Populated places in Hadrut Province
Nagorno-Karabakh
Former Armenian inhabited settlements